Radio Songs is an album of duo Robin and Linda Williams on the Red House Records label, released in 2007.

Radio Songs consists of recordings made when performing on Garrison Keillor's NPR radio program A Prairie Home Companion. Although Robin and Linda first appeared on the show regularly in 1976, the selections on this compilation only reach as far back as 1993. Many of the tunes were not otherwise recorded by the duo and are only available on this collection. Included are collaborations with the Hopeful Gospel Quartet, Mountain Heart, Mike Seeger, Peter Ostroushko, and house musicians, Guy's All-Star Shoe Band.

Track listing 
"Blue Ridge Cabin Home" (Louise Certain, Gladys Stacey) – 2:52
"By the Touch of Her Hand" (Carter) – 3:29
"The Other Side of Town" (Jerome Clark, Robin Williams, Linda Williams) – 3:20
"Things I've Learned" (Clark, Williams, Williams) – 2:48
"50, 000 Names" (O'Hara) – 4:04
"Feed My Sheep" (Traditional) – 2:41
"We'll Meet Again" (Hughie Charles, Ross Parker) – 2:44
"So It Go" (Clark, Williams, Williams) – 3:42
"I'll Twine Mid the Ringlets" (Maude Irving, J. P. Webster) –  4:18
"If the River Was Whiskey (Hesitation Blues)	" (Poole) – 3:08
"So Long, See You Tomorrow" (Clark, Williams, Williams) – 3:40
"Restless One" (Jerry Clark, Dave Hull) – 4:07
"Home Sweet Home Medley:"
"Introduction" –  0:24
"Home Sweet Home" (Henry Bishop, John Howard Payne) – 0:58
"A Mother's Prayer" (Traditional) – 1:47
"Daddy and Home" (Elsie McWilliams, Jimmie Rodgers) – 1:24
"Mom and Dad's Waltz" (Lefty Frizzell) – 1:40
"Precious Memories" (Traditional) – 3:32
"Marvin & Mavis Smiley/Down Home Diva" (Capurro, DiCapua, Keillor) – 4:07

Musicians
Linda Williams – vocals, guitar, background vocals
Robin Williams – vocals, guitar, background vocals
Barry Abernathy – banjo
Pat Donohue – guitar
Richard Dworsky – organ, piano, arranger
Gary Raynor – bass
Arnie Kinsella – percussion
Andy Stein – fiddle
Peter Ostroushko – mandolin
Jimmy Gaudreau – mandolin
Steve Gulley – guitar
Greg Hippen – bass
Clay Jones – guitar
Garrison Keillor – vocals
Kate MacKenzie – vocals
Kevin Maul – dobro
Jason Moore – bass
John Niemann – fiddle, mandolin
Mike Seeger – autoharp
Adam Steffey – mandolin
Jim VanCleve – fiddle
Jim Watson – bass, vocals

Production notes
Produced, mixed and mastered by Chris Frymire
Engineered by Scott Rivard
Photography by Dan Zimmerman and Melinda Sue Gordon
Liner notes by Linda Williams

References

External links
Official Site
The Washington Post. Geoffrey Himes article.

Robin and Linda Williams albums
2007 live albums
Red House Records albums